Judith Cochrane (born 31 October 1975) is an Alliance Party politician from Northern Ireland who was a member of Northern Ireland Assembly for the East Belfast constituency from 2011 to 2016.

Early life
Cochrane is a lifelong resident of East Belfast, having been born and raised in Bloomfield and educated at Strandtown Primary School and Methodist College Belfast. After earning her Bachelor's in Nutrition at Robert Gordon University, Aberdeen, she returned to Belfast to complete her Master's in Business Administration at Queen's University, Belfast.

Electoral history
Prior to her election as MLA, Cochrane served as a Councillor on Castlereagh Borough Council between 2005 and 2011 and worked in the Department for Social Development and as a Management Consultant for SMEs in Northern Ireland.

During her term at Stormont, Cochrane sat on the Finance and Personnel Committee and was a member of the Assembly Commission. She founded the All Party Group on SMEs and was a member of the All Party Group on Cancer, the All Party Group on Tourism, and the All Party Group on Rugby, which she co-founded and served on as vice chair.

She was also the present Chairperson of the Northern Ireland Assembly and Business Trust.

In addition to her duties at Stormont, Cochrane ran her own constituency office on the Upper Newtownards Road in Ballyhackamore.

Cochrane chose not to seek reelection, and stood down ahead of the Northern Ireland Assembly election in 2016, Former MLA and MP for East Belfast Naomi Long replaced her on the ballot.

Personal life
Cochrane is married to Jonathan with whom she has two children. The family reside in East Belfast and actively attend Bloomfield Presbyterian Church.

References

External links
Link to official website

1975 births
Living people
Female members of the Northern Ireland Assembly
Northern Ireland MLAs 2011–2016
Alliance Party of Northern Ireland MLAs
Alumni of Queen's University Belfast
Alumni of Robert Gordon University
People educated at Methodist College Belfast
Members of Castlereagh Borough Council
Women councillors in Northern Ireland